Short Course may refer to:

Short course, a 25-metre or 25-yard swimming pool
History of the Communist Party of the Soviet Union (Bolsheviks), book colloquially known as the Short Course
Farm and Industry Short Course at the University of Wisconsin-Madison
St John's Short Course, Isle of Man road racing circuit

See also
Short track (disambiguation)